John David Courtney (1901-1948) was an Australian rugby league footballer who played in the 1920s and 1930s.

Life and career
Born at St. Leonards, New South Wales in 1901,  Courtney played his entire career at  North Sydney. 

He played with them for seven seasons between 1924-1931 and was a prolific point scorer for the club. He became the NSWRFL top point scorer in 1924 and 1926.

Death
Courtney died on 9 March 1948 at Royal North Shore Hospital, age 47.

References

North Sydney Bears players
Australian rugby league players
1901 births
1948 deaths
Rugby league players from Sydney